Mikael Agopov (born 5 March, 1978) is a Finnish-Armenian chess player. He was awarded the title of International master in 1999. His highest Elo- rating was 2465 (in June 2015) and as of July 2021, he is ranked Finland's 5th best active player.

He has won the Finnish Chess Championship three times; in 2011, 2015, and 2018.

In 2013, he shared the lead with Uladzislaŭ Kavaljoŭ in an international tournament in Viljandi dedicated to the 100th anniversary of Ilmar Raud.

References

1978 births
Living people
Finnish chess players
Armenian chess players
Finnish people of Armenian descent
Chess International Masters